Mónica Rueda Guardeño (born 20 January 1976 in Jaén) is a field hockey defender from Spain. She represented her native country at two Summer Olympics: in 1996 (Atlanta, Georgia) and 2004 (Athens, Greece). She played club hockey at Club de Campo in Madrid.

Notes

References

 Spanish Olympic Committee

External links
 
 
 
 

1976 births
Living people
Spanish female field hockey players
Olympic field hockey players of Spain
Field hockey players at the 1996 Summer Olympics
Field hockey players at the 2004 Summer Olympics